Miriplatin (INN; trade name Miripla) is a drug used to treat hepatocellular carcinoma (HCC). It is a lipophilic platinum complex that is used in transcatheter arterial chemoembolization (TACE). Miriplatin was approved by Japan's Pharmaceuticals and Medical Devices Agency in 2009.

See also 
 Oxaliplatin

References

External links 
 Development of Miriplatin, a Novel Antitumor Platinum for Hepatocellular Carcinoma

Platinum-based antineoplastic agents